The Major Vellayani Devi Temple is a highly revered shrine in Kerala, India, dedicated to goddess Bhadrakali. The shrine is situated in Vellayani 1.5 km west of Vellayani junction, 12 km southeast of Thiruvananthapuram on the eastern bank of Vellayani Lake.  The temple is under the management of Travancore Devaswom Board. The temple structure has a bronze roof with traditional art work and carries Dravidian architecture. The temple has eastern and northern towers called Gopurams with statues of different Gods sculptured in them. The Gopurams function as gateways through the walls that surround the temple complex.

Vellayani Devi Temple is renowned for celebrating the longest non-Pilgrimage festival of South India and the duration of the festival is around 65 to 70 days. This festival is held every three years.

Deities

The temple enshrines Goddess Bhadrakali as the presiding deity. The deity, as per the scriptures is a form of Shiva's wrath. Goddess Kali is situated toward the north (vadakke nada). The idol is known in the local Malayalam language as Thirumudi. The idol of the Goddess in the Vellayani temple is one of the largest among the idols of Kerala Kali temples. The idol is four and a half feet in height as well as width. Pure gold and precious stones decorate the frontal view of the idol.

Other deities worshipped at the Vellayani Devi temple called Upadevatha's temples include Lord Shiva, Lord Ganesh and Nagaraja. The temple also has a small sub-temple where another deity Madan Thampuran is enshrined.

In the temple Antler is also worshipped. The circulating notion about this is that the antler serves as a medium to invoke the spirit of the divinity at a new-built temple. One of the antlers kept in the Sanctum sanctorum oriented towards the east is from the Thekkathu.

History
Legend says that a Kollan (blacksmith) named Kelan Kulasekhara saw a frog with divine spirit of Goddess near Vellayani Lake. He caught the divine frog with the help of his assistant who belonged to a low caste. They brought the matter to the Nair chieftains of the locality and with their help Kulasekhara consecrated the Thiru Mudi (idol) in which divine spirit is evoked. The right to perform Uchabali (a ritual connected with festival of the temple) is still held by the Nair families. Priest of the temple is not belonging to Brahmin community but a selected person belonging to the Kollan (blacksmith) community.

Kali - Darika Legend 
Darika was a demon who received a boon from Brahma which granted that he would never be defeated by any man living in any of the fourteen worlds of Hindu mythology. This made Darika immensely powerful and arrogant. Armed with this boon, Darika went on to conquer the world, defeating even Indra, the king of the gods. As his atrocities became intolerable, the sage Narada requested Shiva to contain Darika. Shiva agreed, circumventing Brahma's boon by declaring that Darika would be killed by the goddess Kali. Shiva opened his third eye and produced Kali, whose purpose was to destroy Darika. Goddess being a woman and one not born among the humans. Goddess did so by beheading him. Goddess didn't stop with Darika and, unable to control her rage, began destroying the landscape and the very humans for whose sake she had destroyed Darika. The Gods could not defeat her, and she was finally calmed when Shiva lay on the ground in front of her, submitting.

Festival

Vellayani Devi Temple is renowned for celebrating the longest non-Pilgrimage festival of South India and the duration of the festival is around 65 to 70 days. This festival is held every three years, usually between February and April. The festival is known as the Kaliyoottu Mahotsavam, which literally means "the festival to sumptuously feed Devi". Kaliyoottu is the dramatic presentation of the genesis of Bhadrakali and Darika the representatives of good and evil respectively, their confrontation and later the extermination of Darika in devotional terms and with rhythmic footsteps.

Karadikottu
Karadikottu is the maiden custom related with the festival performed with a special drum.  The performer is locally known as Panan.

Kalamkaval 

Kalamkaval is a famous customs practiced at the temple premises and nearby places during festival. It is believed that the Goddess Bhadrakali searches her enemy demon, Daaruka in all directions before putting him to death. Devotees commemorate this legend by seeing this unique Kalamkaval. Kalamkaval is the ritual in which chief priest, carries the idol on his head and performs some trance like dances until he is unconscious. During kalamkaval, chief priest wears anklet and thiruvabharam (traditional gold ornaments of goddess that includes kappu, vanki, odyanam, paalakka mala, pichi mottu mala, muthu mala etc.). All people believe that the priest gets strength to carry on the trance with the idol on his head, due to the blessings of the Devi enshrined in the temple.

Nagaroottu 

Nagaroottu is the custom performed (before "Uchabali") for the satisfaction of Naga.

Uchabali 

Uchabali is another custom performed during the festival. About sixty four gestures like in Kadhakali are used for the performance. Mathsyam, sampannam, chathurasramam, sarppamudra, and jyothimudra are some of the main gestures used.  A beautiful crown built of coconut palm is fixed at the spot of Uchabali.  Uchabali is performed during midnight.

Paranettu 
It is believed that a fight erupted between Devi and the demon Darikan in sky. The fight is enacted on a specially erected stage, about 100 feet high and is conducted at night known as Paranettu.

Nilathilporu
Nilathilporu that marks the conclusion of the Kaaliyoottu festival at Vellayani Devi Temple. During the climactic moment of this ceremony, the demon Daarika (the man with the symbolic crown in the foreground) weeps and begs for mercy from the Goddess. Subsequently, the Goddess beheads the demon.

Aaraattu
The festival, Kaliyoottu, ended with a grand procession knows as Aaraattu. During Aaraattu the Idol is cleaned using water collected from 101 pots. Aaraattu is conducted at vellayani lake. A girl from the priest family below ten years of age, along with chief priest performs the function.

Aswathy Pongala
Pongala Festival at Vellayani Devi Temple is celebrated during the Malayalam month of Meenam on the Aswathy Nakshatram (Aswini Nakshatra). Pongala is the rice cooked with jaggery, ghee, coconut as well as other ingredients in the open in small pots by women to please the Goddess.

Pooja timing
Every day, the temple opens at  5:30 pm and closes at 8:00 pm. On Sunday, Tuesday and Friday, the temple is also open from 12:30 pm to 2:00 pm, during which a special Madhu Pooja is performed for the Goddess.  On the first day of all Malayalam months, the  temple will open at morning 5:30 am and close at 8:00 am.

Fireworks blast accident
One person died of the five persons who were injured in an explosion in temple firework shed on 26 March 2012. The accident took place around 8.45 a.m. when last-minute arrangements were on for the Aswathi pongala festival at the temple. The embers from an exploded pipe gun fell on the stored explosives resulting in the blast.  The compound that housed the fireworks shed was behind the temple and soon after the blast, the area was engulfed in smoke. The police have registered cases against five men for careless handling of explosives.

See also 

 List of Hindu temples in Kerala
 Vellayani Lake
 Attukal Temple
 Padmanabhaswamy Temple
 Bhadrakali

References

External links

 Pilgrim Centers in Thiruvanthapuram Kerala.me

http://www.keralaculture.org/kerala-festivals/kaliyoottu-vellayani/203/2

Hindu temples in Thiruvananthapuram district
Shakti temples
Devi temples in Kerala
Hindu temples
Hindu temples in Kerala